The Spillings Hoard is the world's largest Viking silver treasure, found on Friday 16July 1999 in a field at the Spilling farm northwest of Slite, on northern Gotland, Sweden. The silver hoard consisted of two parts with a total weight of  before conservation and consisted of, among other things, 14,295 coins most of which were Islamic from other countries. The three caches had been hidden under the floorboards of a Viking outhouse sometime during the 9th century.

Discovery 
On Friday 16July 1999, a team of reporters from the Swedish television TV4 were in the socken of Othem on Gotland to film a cultural feature from Almedalen Week. They chose to do a segment on the problem with looting of archaeological sites with archaeologist Jonas Ström acting as their guide along with Kenneth Jonsson, a professor of numismatics, who happened to be on the island at that time. Spillings farm was selected for the filming since about 150 silver coins and bronze objects had been found there earlier by the landowner Björn Engström.

With filming complete, Ström and Jonsson decided to continue their survey of the field. Twenty minutes after the TV-crew had left, they heard a strong signal from their metal detector, which led them to the smaller of the two silver caches. A couple of hours later and only  from the first find, they received another signal from the detector:

The site was hurriedly cordoned off, back-up crew from the museum was sent for, permission for an archaeological excavation was immediately sought at the County Administrative Board and guards were posted. However, instead of keeping the find a secret, the Gotland Museum decided to go public with the find immediately. During the first weekend, over 2,000 people visited the excavation site.

The archaeologists concentrated on uncovering the two first finds before starting with the third. Due to the size of the hoards and the fragility of the objects, the bottom layers of the depositions were encapsulated in plaster. Only when they tried to lift the finds out of the soil did the archaeologists realize how heavy the hoards were. An attempt to X-ray the finds at the local hospital failed because they contained so much silver that the X-ray plates remained blank.

The larger find was intact but the smaller had been damaged by a plough. A previous landowner who visited the excavation commented that he had found metal wires around the find-spot several years earlier, but thinking that they were only steel wire, he had thrown them away. It was therefore concluded that the treasure had originally been even larger.

With the two first caches taken care of, the third deposition was excavated almost a year after the first discovery. This find was deemed even more valuable since very few finds contain such large amounts of bronze intended for smelting.

Further excavations 

Additional excavations were conducted in the summer of 2000 and in 2003-06. Remnants of wood, iron rivets and mounts as well as a lock mechanism were found, leading to the conclusion that the caches had been stored in chests.

An extended survey and excavation revealed the foundations of a building and indicated that the hoards had been placed under the floorboards of what would probably have been a warehouse, shed or storage rather than a dwelling since it had no hearth. Carbon dating showed that the building had been in use between 540 and 1040. It had been built on an older Iron Age foundation.

Find 
In the bronze deposit were found substantial pieces of wood and iron, such as fittings, ironwork, nails and a lock-device, showing that the bronze had been kept in a sturdy chest. A carbon dating of the chest dated it to approximately 675, making it older than the objects stored inside it.

Although silver hoards and treasures are not unusual on Gotland, this was an exceptionally large find. One explanation may be found in the location near some of the island's best and most significant harbours during the Viking Age. The silver in the caches would have been enough to pay the tax to the Swedish king for all of Gotland for five years.

The following surveys and excavations of the fields surrounding the find-site showed that the site had been inhabited continuously over 1,000 years up until the 19th century. Over 700 more objects were retrieved, such as objects of bronze and copper, fired clay, clothes pins, a piece of glass, tile pieces, chains, needles, glass beads, slag, iron nails, polished semi-precious stones and brick.

The Spillings Hoard is the world's largest Viking silver treasure. A finder's fee of SEK 2,091,672 (approx. US$242,400) was paid to the landowner for the treasure, although the real value of it is much higher. It was the largest amount of money ever paid for a find in Sweden, according to director of the Swedish National Heritage Board Sven Göthe. The hoard was dated to have been hidden some time after 870–71. The treasure is on permanent display in the Gotland Museum.

This includes 168,000 silver coins from the Arab world, North Africa and Central Asia.

Silver depositions 
The caches contained silver objects ranging from coins, bars, thread and hacksilver to be used as raw material, to jewelry such as fingerings, bangles and pendants. Much of the material had been bundled up to correspond with the mark-weight system of the Viking Age, in which  made one mark.

Almost 60% of the find consisted of 486 bangles or parts thereof, making it the largest ever find of such silver jewellery . Most of the bracelets weighed around 100 grams under the mark-weight system and were of traditional Gotlandic design, a number of them have very detailed ornamentation. There were also bangles of British and Western Scandinavian design as well as plain, undecorated fingerings of Finnish and British design, known as ring money.

Of the 14,295 coins found, 14,200 were Islamic dirhams, four were Nordic (from Hedeby), one was Byzantine and 23 were from Persia. The earliest, a Persian coin, dates from 539 and the latest from 870. Many of the coins (as well as the bangles) had marks that may have been made when the purity of the silver was tested. There were several imitations and fakes among the coins. The illegal copies were made from good silver, but made in other places than where the originals were minted. All in all, 69 different minting locations from 15 present-day countries were identified in the hoard.

During the conservation work of the larger hoard (No 2) it became evident that the larger objects had been placed at the bottom of the cache and the smaller ones, ending with the cut coins, had been strewn on top.

Moses coin 
One of the most noted coins in the hoard, dated to  800, is from the Khazar Kingdom and designated the "Moses Coin". According to written sources the Khazars are believed to be of the Jewish religion, but few objects have been found to support this claim. The coin is inscribed with "Moses is the messenger of God" instead of the usual Muslim text "Muhammad is the messenger of God".

Bronze deposition 

Excavated in the same manner as the silver hoards, the bronze cache was encapsulated on site and transported to the Gotland Museum for further examination. Most of the bronze objects were broken, fragmented or partially melted, suggesting that they were kept in the heartwood chest to be used as raw material for new artifacts. Individual finds consisted of parts of, and some complete, necklaces, bangles, fingerings, pins for clothes and mounts for drinking horns. The bronze objects span a period of 200–300 years and are mostly of Baltic origin or possibly Russian with only a few of them Scandinavian. Even though several scholars have been involved in identifying the deposition, no consensus have been reached regarding why the hoard was collected or the dating of it. Two theories are that it was either the stock of a foundryman living on Gotland, or booty from a Viking raid that was hidden under the floor of the outhouse.

Gallery

See also 
Havor Hoard
Cuerdale Hoard
Silverdale Hoard
Sundveda Hoard
Molnby Hoard
Vale of York Hoard
Mildenhall Treasure

References

Bibliography 

Viking treasure troves
Silver objects
Archaeological artifacts
Archaeology of Sweden
Scandinavian culture
Hoards of jewellery
1999 in Sweden
1999 archaeological discoveries